Silver Creek Township is one of twelve townships in Clark County, Indiana. As of the 2010 census, its population was 11,858 and it contained 4,858 housing units.

History
Silver Creek Township was established in or before 1815, but when exactly is uncertain because records have been lost. The township takes its name from Silver Creek, the largest stream in Clark County.

Geography

Cities and towns
 Clarksville (north quarter)
 Sellersburg

Unincorporated towns
 Hamburg
 Speed

Adjacent townships
 Union Township (north)
 Charlestown Township (northeast)
 Utica Township (east)
 Jeffersonville Township (south)
 New Albany Township, Floyd County (southwest)
 Carr Township (northwest)

Major highways
  Interstate 65
  U.S. Route 31
  State Road 60
  State Road 311
  State Road 403

Cemeteries
The township contains several cemeteries: Bottorff/Couch, Cremer/Kramer, Cunningham, Hendricks (a.k.a. Sarles Cemetery and Hell's Half Acre), Hopewell Baptist Church, Jenkins, Lehmanowsky, Phelps, Poindexter, Plum Run, Sellersburg, Smith Cemetery, St. Joseph Catholic Church, Francis Wells Family (a.k.a. Francis Wells), Whalen

References
 United States Census Bureau cartographic boundary files
 U.S. Board on Geographic Names

External links

 Indiana Township Association
 United Township Association of Indiana

Townships in Clark County, Indiana
Townships in Indiana